Belleville Municipal Stadium is a facility located in Belleville, New Jersey.   It is the home of the New Jersey Titans  of the Women's Spring Football League (WSFL), and the New Jersey Spartans  football organization.

References

External links
 New Jersey Spartans home field - Belleville Municipal Stadium

American football venues in New Jersey
Sports venues in Essex County, New Jersey